"Ciao Bella" is the third and final single from Don Omar's third studio album iDon released on August 18, 2009 through Machete, VI. The song is written by Omar, Paul Irizarry and Eddie Montilla, and produced by Echo.

Charts

References

External links
 iDon.com
 Don Omar Official Site

2009 singles
Salsa songs
Don Omar songs
2009 songs
Songs written by Don Omar
Machete Music singles